Aoi Futaba may refer to:

Aoi Futaba, a character in the manga series You're Under Arrest
Aoi Futaba, a character in the anime series Vividred Operation
Futaba Aoi, Japanese manga artist